Maurice Ehlinger (25 September 1896 – 26 August 1981) was a French painter. His work was part of the painting event in the art competition at the 1932 Summer Olympics.

References

1896 births
1981 deaths
20th-century French painters
20th-century French male artists
French male painters
Olympic competitors in art competitions
People from Haute-Saône
19th-century French male artists